Vettai : Pledged to Hunt was the first season of Singapore's Tamil, 72-part crime drama, Vettai. The series ran on-air from 23 November 2010 to 30 March 2011, every Monday to Thursday, at 10:30 pm on the MediaCorp Vasantham channel. The season was directed by Anuratha Kanderaju and Abbas Akbar.

Plot summary
A special task force was assembled to tackle crime cases pertaining to the Indian community and Indian immigrants. Not widely publicized, the unit is kept under wraps.

Spearheaded by Chief Dayanidhi, the force consists of three teams and a criminologist. Together they investigate cold-blooded murders, kidnappings and sexual crimes. But as professional and personal lives collide, the force appears headed towards a perilous outcome with lives to be lost and bonds to be broken. The group's pledge to uphold justice and peace in their country will be put to the test.

Cast

Main cast
Gunalan Morgan as Mugi
Arvind Naidu as Shan
Vignesh Wadarajan as Seelan
Shabir as Nantha
Gayathri Segaran as Radha
Sathish Rames as Prakash
Indra Chandran as Regina
Gayathri Sharma as Suganya
Jivvenesh Sivan as Jivva

Supporting cast
Rishi Kumaar as Praveen
Elias Mikhail as Chandrabose

Guest cast
 Puravalan
 Saravanan Ayavoo
 Kishore

Characters
Team 1: Nantha (Shabir) and Seelan (Vignesh) are a powerhouse duo. Well matched in intelligence and physical strength they are a force to be reckoned with. They complement each other well and intuitively recognize one another's moves to cover themselves on duty. They bear grudges against each other, however, which could wreck the entire unit. Seelan is the unit's only married man and is a proud father of a daughter. He is responsible and practical about saving money and achieving family security. Dark and handsome, he has a broody nature that foretells secrets which only he may know. Nantha, on the other hand, is single and likes her independence. Will they collide or unite to take on their enemies?

Team 2: Mugi is paired with rookie Prakash. Frequently their personalities collide and their ideologies run in parallel without meeting to compromise. Prakash is a university graduate, while Mugi is a secondary school diploma holder who signed onto the service. Prakash abides by rules and follows protocol strictly, to Mugi's great irritation. Mugi leans toward a 'do first, explain later' attitude. He has no interest in explaining procedures to Prakash, and frequently relegates Prakash to administrative tasks like buying coffee and curry puffs, photocopying, faxing and filing. Should Prakash comment on anything, Mugi attributes it to Prakash's arrogance in being a graduate. Will these partners solve a crime without killing each other first?

Team 3: Shanmugam (affectionately known as Shan) and Radha are best buddies and the most fun-loving team in the unit. Both are in love, but not with each other. They are attractive young individuals, but their friendship and camaraderie are purely platonic. Radha is secretly in love with Nantha, while Shan adores Gina, the in-house criminologist. How will their love interests play out?

Crew
 Directors: Anuratha Kanderaju and Abbas Akbar
 Executive Producer: Prema Pon Rajoo
 Assistant Directors: Radha Jeevan, Vathsala Naidu Danabalan and Pavithra Chandra Kumar
 Screenplay / Dialogue: Jaya Rathakrishnan and Rajarathinam Tamilmaran
 Photography: S. Ananth and R. Asogan
 Music and Effects: L. Chandiramogan
 Sound: A. Selva Kumar and Gan
 Camera: Terence Yap and Geeshan Srimantha
 Editing: Agustin K.M., David Anil Sharma and K. Sailenran Pragash
 Stunts: Jimmy Low
 Post Production: Video Houze

Episodic synopsis

Vettai finale preview
Vettai's final three episodes were shown on Cathay, Orchard Cineleisure, at 7:00 pm.

Soundtrack

Vettai's soundtrack consists of two tracks composed and sung by Shabir and Rishi Kumaar. The song "Tadak Tadak" also included Malaysian rapper Emcee Jazz. "Oru Murai" love theme lyrics were written by Jaya Rathakrishnan.

Awards
The police drama Vettai : Pledged to Hunt took home many awards at Pradhana Vizha 2011, Vasantham's annual awards show honouring the best in the local television industry.
 Best Opening Title - Pradhana Vizha 2011
 Most Popular Series - Pradhana Vizha 2011
 Best Actor, Shabir - Pradhana Vizha 2011

References

External links
 https://web.archive.org/web/20141224071253/http://www1.mediacorp.sg/vettai/about.htm
 https://web.archive.org/web/20110130163443/http://video.xin.msn.com/browse/tv/show?tag=vettai
 http://www.facebook.com/pages/Vettai/159404890761293?sk=info#!/pages/Vettai/159404890761293?sk=wall
 Official site - Vettai

Vasantham TV original programming
Tamil-language television shows in Singapore
Tamil-language police television series
Singapore Tamil dramas
2010 Tamil-language television series debuts
2010 Tamil-language television series endings
2011 Tamil-language television seasons